VRC-50 was a Fleet Logistics Squadron of the U.S. Navy. The squadron was established as Fleet Tactical Support Squadron 50 (VRC-50) on 1 October 1966, redesignated as Fleet Logistics Support Squadron Fifty (VRC-50) on 1 April 1976 and disestablished on 7 October 1994.

Operational history

20 January 1989, US-3A #157996 crashed near Subic Bay, Philippines. Both crewmen, including the commanding officer were killed

Home port assignments
The squadron was assigned to these home ports:
NAS Atsugi
NAS North Island
NAS Cubi Point
Andersen Air Force Base

Aircraft assignment
C-1 Trader
C-2 Greyhound
CT-39 Sabreliner
C-130F Hercules
US-3A Viking

See also
 List of inactive United States Navy aircraft squadrons
 History of the United States Navy

References

External links

 Website of former squadronmembers

Fleet logistics support squadrons of the United States Navy